John Quentin McCord (June 26, 1978 – August 13, 2020) was an American professional football player who was a wide receiver in the National Football League (NFL) and Canadian Football League (CFL). He was drafted in the seventh round of the 2001 NFL Draft by the Atlanta Falcons. He played college football at Kentucky.

In his career, McCord also played with the Oakland Raiders, Winnipeg Blue Bombers, Edmonton Eskimos. He finished his career playing arena football with the Kentucky Horsemen in the AF2.

College career
McCord attended the University of Kentucky where he is considered one of the first players in the "LaGrange pipeline". At Kentucky, he recorded 1,743 career receiving yards, ranking fourth all-time among Kentucky receivers.

Professional career

National Football League
McCord was selected in the seventh round (236th overall) of the 2001 NFL Draft by the Atlanta Falcons, where he played for three seasons. While playing for the Falcons, he recorded 23 receptions for 427 yards and a touchdown. The best statistical year of his career came in 2002, when he recorded 11 receptions for 253 yards and one touchdown. He also played as a kick and punt returner. He then spent part of the 2004 season on the practice squad of the Oakland Raiders.

Canadian Football League
McCord was out of football in 2005; however, he signed with the Winnipeg Blue Bombers of the Canadian Football League in 2006. On April 20, he re-signed with the Blue Bombers, however, he was later released. On September 2, McCord was signed by the Edmonton Eskimos. He was released, and then re-signed on October 2. He remained with the club until April 10, 2008, when he was released a final time.

af2
In 2009, McCord joined Arena Football League's developmental league af2 and was assigned to the Kentucky Horsemen.

Personal
McCord died on August 13, 2020, at the age of 42.

References

External links
 ESPN.com profile

1978 births
2020 deaths
American football wide receivers
Kentucky Wildcats football players
Atlanta Falcons players
Canadian football wide receivers
Georgia Force players
Winnipeg Blue Bombers players
Place of death missing
Edmonton Elks players
Kentucky Horsemen players
Players of American football from Georgia (U.S. state)
People from LaGrange, Georgia